Tāmaki Makaurau is a New Zealand parliamentary Māori electorate returning one Member of Parliament to the New Zealand House of Representatives.

It derives its name from the Māori-language name for Auckland;  is a descriptive epithet referring to the value and desirability of the land.

Population centres
In its current boundaries, Tāmaki Makaurau contains the west coast of the Auckland Region between Te Henga / Bethells Beach and the mouth of the Manukau Harbour, parts of West Auckland east of the Oratia Stream and Te Wai-o-Pareira / Henderson Creek (excluding Te Atatū Peninsula), the entire Auckland isthmus, Waiheke Island, East Auckland and South Auckland as far as Takanini (including Māngere, Ōtara, Pakuranga and Manurewa). It does not contain Great Barrier or Rangitoto islands, as they are in Te Tai Tokerau; Papakura is in Hauraki-Waikato.

In the review of boundaries in 2007, the southern part of Manurewa shifted from Tāmaki Makaurau to the Hauraki-Waikato electorate. The 2013/14 redistribution did not further alter the boundaries of the electorate, but the 2020 boundary review made small expansions for Tāmaki Makaurau to  the electorate's north and south, as well as incorporating the islands Waiheke and Ponui. To the north, Glendene and Te Atatū South are now included, while the southern portion now incorporates Flat Bush and Takanini.

Tribal areas
The main iwi of Tāmaki Makaurau are Ngāti Whātua, Kawerau a Maki, Tainui, Ngāti Pāoa, Wai-O-Hua and Ngāti Rehua, though a pan-Māori organisation called Ngāti Akarana exists for urbanised Māori with no knowledge of their actual iwi; and, through a population trend whereby many rural Māori moved to the cities, the largest iwi affiliation in the seat are Ngāpuhi, Ngāti Porou, Waikato and Ngāti Maniapoto, all iwi local to other areas of New Zealand.

History
 derives its name from the Māori-language name for Auckland, meaning "Tāmaki desired by many", in reference to the desirability of its natural resources and geography.

John Tamihere of the Labour Party was the representative for Hauraki, and he also won the first election in the Tāmaki Makaurau electorate in 2002. Tamihere spent his six-year parliamentary career dogged by controversy that often overshadowed his work as a minister and, at the 2005 election came ten percent behind Māori Party co-leader Pita Sharples. Because Tamihere had chosen not to seek a list placing, his parliamentary career was terminated. Sharples remained the current representative for the electorate until his retirement, when the Labour's Peeni Henare won the seat.

Members of Parliament for Tāmaki Makaurau
Unless otherwise stated, all MPs terms began and ended at a general election.

Key

List MPs from Tāmaki Makaurau
Members of Parliament elected from party lists in elections where that person also unsuccessfully contested the Tāmaki Makaurau electorate. Unless otherwise stated, all MPs terms began and ended at general elections.

1Wall was elected from the party list in April 2011 following the resignation of Darren Hughes.
2Jones resigned from Parliament on 22 May 2014.
3Davidson was elected from the party list in November 2015 following the resignation of Russel Norman.

Election results

2020 election

2017 election

2014 election

2011 election

Electorate (as at 26 November 2011): 35,347

2008 election

2005 election

2002 election

References

Māori electorates
Politics of the Auckland Region
2002 establishments in New Zealand